Sir Thomas Rich, 1st Baronet (c. 1601 – 15 October 1667) was an English merchant and politician who sat in House of Commons in 1660. He established Sir Thomas Rich's School, a grammar school.

Rich was born in Gloucester, son of Thomas Rich, an alderman of the city, and Anne, daughter of Thomas Machin, in 1601. He was sent to school in London and went on to study at the newly founded Wadham College, Oxford. Afterwards, he worked in the city of London in the wine importing trade. Rich later purchased the manor of Sonning, near Reading.

In 1657 Rich was appointed High Sheriff of Berkshire and in 1660 elected Member of Parliament (MP) for Reading in the Convention Parliament. In 1661, Charles II created him Baronet of Sunning, Berkshire. Rich died in 1667 and was buried in the Rich Chapel in the parish church at Sonning – his monument has been moved to under the church tower.

In his will, Rich left £6000 and his house in Gloucester to establish a school for poor boys. The money was invested in local farmland, and the rent generated by the house was used to pay for the upkeep and operation of the school. Sir Thomas Rich's School opened in 1668, one year after Rich's death, and is still in use today as a grammar school, although not in its original location. The Tommy Psalm (the School Song) describes the history of the school (albeit incorrectly).

Marriages

He married firstly Barbara Morewood, daughter of Gilbert Morewood and Martha Saunderson, by whom he had one daughter Mary, who married Sir Robert Gayer. He married, secondly, Elizabeth Cockayne (or Cokayne), by whom he had several children, including William, his son and heir.

References

1600s births
1667 deaths
People from Sonning
People from Gloucester
Alumni of Wadham College, Oxford
Baronets in the Baronetage of England
English MPs 1660
High Sheriffs of Berkshire
Members of the Parliament of England (pre-1707) for Reading
17th-century merchants
17th-century English businesspeople